Beloved Sky (Persian: Aseman-e mahboob) is a 2011 film by the Iranian director Dariush Mehrjui. Mehrjui also wrote the script with Vahideh Mohammadi. The film was lensed by Farrokh Majidi, and starred Ali Mosaffa, Leila Hatami, Mani Haghighi and Farideh Sepah Mansour in the principal roles.

References

Iranian drama films
Films directed by Dariush Mehrjui